Basic knitted fabrics include stocking stitch, reverse stocking stitch, garter stitch, seed stitch, faggoting, and tricot.  In some cases, these fabrics appear differently on the right side (as seen when making the stitch) than on the wrong side (as seen from the other side, when the work is turned).

Stockinette/stocking stitch and reverse stockinette stitch
Stocking stitch (in US, stockinette stitch) is the most basic knitted fabric; every stitch (as seen from the right side) is a knit stitch.  In the round, stocking stitch is produced by knitting every stitch; by contrast, in the flat, stocking stitch is produced by knitting and purling alternate rows.

Stocking-stitch fabric is very smooth and each column ("wale") resembles a stacked set of "V"'s.  It has a strong tendency to curl horizontally and vertically because of the asymmetry of its faces.

Reverse stocking stitch is produced in the same way as stocking, except that the purl stitches are done on the right side and the knit stitches on the wrong side.  In the round, reverse stocking stitch is produced by purling every stitch.

Garter stitch

Garter stitch is the most basic form of welting (as seen from the right side).  In the round, garter stitch is produced by knitting and purling alternate rounds.  By contrast, in the flat, garter stitch is produced by knitting every stitch (or purling every stitch, though this is much less common, and often referred to as 'reverse garter stitch').

In garter-stitch fabrics, the "purl" rows stand out from the "knit" rows ( a similar effect is used in shadow knitting). Together, they form little horizontal ridges. Garter-stitch fabric has significant lengthwise elasticity and little tendency to curl, due to the symmetry of its faces.

Seed/moss stitch
Seed stitch is the most basic form of a basketweave pattern; knit and purl stitches alternate in every column ("wale") and every row ("course").  In other words, every knit stitch is flanked on all four sides (left and right, top and bottom) by purl stitches, and vice versa. Moss stitch (also called Irish/American moss stitch) is created by alternating between knit and purl stitches across every row as well. Here, however, there are always two knit stitches stacked upon each other in every column and they are flanked by two purl stitches on all four sides.

Seed/moss-stitch fabrics lie flat; the symmetry of their two faces prevents them from curling to one side or the other.  Hence, it makes an excellent choice for edging, e.g., the central edges of a cardigan.  However, seed stitch is "nubbly", not nearly as smooth as stockinette/stocking stitch.

Faggoting

Faggoting is a variation of lace knitting, in which every stitch is a yarn over or a decrease.  There are several types of faggoting, but all are an extremely open lace similar to netting.

Like most lace fabrics, faggoting has little structural strength and deforms easily, so it has little tendency to curl despite being asymmetrical. Faggoting is stretchy and open, and most faggoting stitches look the same on both sides, making them ideal for garments like lacy scarves or stockings.

Tricot knitting
Tricot is a special case of warp knitting, in which the yarn zigzags vertically, following a single column ("wale") of knitting, rather than a single row ("course"), as is customary. Tricot and its relatives are very resistant to runs, and are commonly used in lingerie.

Other basic fabrics
Other classes of basic knitted fabrics include ribbing, welting, and cables.

See also 
Pointelle
Ponte (Fabric)

References

 June Hemmons Hiatt (1988) The Principles of Knitting, Simon and Schuster, pp. 18–20.  .
 

Knitting stitches